Le Grand Jeu may refer to:

The Great Game (in French Le Grand Jeu), the strategic rivalry between the British Empire and the Russian Empire for supremacy in central Asia
Le Grand Jeu, the title of a French literary review, founded in 1928 by René Daumal and others
Le Grand Jeu, a 1928 poetry collection by Benjamin Péret

Films 
Le Grand Jeu (1934 film), a 1934 film directed by Jacques Feyder
Le Grand Jeu (1954 film), a 1954 film directed by Robert Siodmak
Le Grand Jeu (2015 film), a 2015 film directed by Nicolas Pariser